Augustine Paper Mill, also known as the Container Corporation of America, Paper Mill Division (Old Wilmington Plant), was a historic paper mill complex located in Wilmington, New Castle County, Delaware. The complex consisted of seven 19th century stone buildings including the original three-story mill building, also known as Building 7, and various later two-level mill structures and support buildings. As of 2022, Building 7 is the only surviving part of the complex. It is a three-story mill erected from randomly laid stone with walls three feet thick, a slate covered gable roof, and an arched brick opening for the mill race.

In 1978, it was added to the National Register of Historic Places. The oldest mill structure, Building 7, was converted for residential use, while the other six buildings were replaced by new construction.

References

External links
Postcard of Augustine Mills on the Brandywine, Wilmington, Delaware; P.S. du Pont Longwood Photograph Collection; Hagley Museum and Library

Industrial buildings and structures on the National Register of Historic Places in Delaware
Industrial buildings completed in 1845
Buildings and structures in Wilmington, Delaware
Pulp and paper mills in the United States
National Register of Historic Places in Wilmington, Delaware